Bythëdosi (also Bitidosi, Bitadosi) was a historical Albanian tribe in the Middle Ages. They inhabited the Brda (Montenegro) area in central and eastern Montenegro, north-east of Podgorica.

The name Bytidosi is a compound of the Albanian word for pig-dosë and buttocks-bythë (podex porci). The name likely originated as the name of a brotherhood, which later developed into a katun, and kept the name.

Bytidosi (spelled in Venetian archives as Bisdos, Butadossi, Bitidossi, Busadossa) is recorded in 1335 and its leader Paulus Busadosa is recorded. In 1415, they appear in a union with the Hoti and Tuzi tribes (Осti, Tusi et Bitidossi). 

In the 1416-17 Venetian cadastre of Shkodër, the surname Butadosi appears in the village of Shën Auraç. The head of the village was a certain Nikë Butadosi. The village also included another Nikë son of the at that point deceased Jon as well as Vuketë Butadosi among other villagers. In the cadastre the writer notes that the leader of the Bytidosi will be required to pay an extra 2 ducats on top of the 10 already being given each year. This is accompanied with a similar increase in wheat to 12 bags as well as an increase in concessions of millet and beans. The order is given by Albano Contareno, Nikolla Zanthani and Andrea Fuskulo.  

In the 1485 defter of the Sanjak of Shkodër the village of Bytidosi is mentioned in the nahije of Kuči. The village included 11 households and could pay up to 550 ducats. The heads included the families of Stepan and Stoja Shara, Gjonça the son  of Dobroshin along with his son Andrija and brother Nika, along with others such as Vuk son of Deli, Andrija Vuku and Petri son of Mihal.

References

Tribes of Montenegro
Albanian communities in Montenegro